The Abdullah ibn Umar Mosque is one of the historical mosques of Kermanshah Province, located in the Dalahu County.

References 

Mosques in Ardabil Province
Mosque buildings with domes
National works of Iran